Harcourt is a civil parish in Kent County, New Brunswick, Canada.

For governance purposes it is divided between the village of Five Rivers in along part of the eastern boundary, the village of and Grand Lake along Route 116 on the western boundary, with the Kent rural district comprising the remainder. Five Rivers and the rural district are members of the Kent Regional Service Commission and Grand Lake belongs to the Capital Region RSC. 

Prior to the 2023 governance reform, the parish formed the southern part of the local service district of the parish of Harcourt.

Origin of name
The parish was named in honour of Earl Harcourt, a Field Marshal of the British Army at the time of its erection and a friend and frequent correspondent of Lieutenant Governor Howard Douglas.

History
Harcourt was erected from unassigned territory south of the Richibucto River in 1827, comprising a much shallower parish than today.

In 1845 Kent County annexed all of Northumberland County behind it. The wording of existing legislation implicitly adds the annexed area to Harcourt.

In 1850 the northern boundary was explicitly set, removing territory north of the North Forks of the Richibucto River.

In 1883 part of Harcourt east of the railway was added to Sainte-Marie Parish.

Boundaries
Harcourt Parish is bounded:

on the north by a line running due east and west from the mouth of Jimmy Graham Fork on the Richibucto River;
on the east by a line running north 22º west, based on the magnet of 1867, from a point on the Westmorland County line twenty miles (32.2 kilometres) west of the northern tip of Shediac Island, running southerly from the north line of the parish to the northern line of Saint-Paul Parish, then southwesterly along the prolongation of a line running southwesterly 68º from the mouth of the Rivière Chockpish-nord to the Canadian National Railway line running alongside Route 126, then southerly to the Westmorland County line;
on the south by the Westmorland County line;
on the west by the Kent County and Northumberland County lines.

Communities
Communities at least partly within the parish; bold indicates an incorporated municipality

Adamsville
Coal Branch
Grangeville
Harcourt
Hébert
Mortimer
Saint-Sosime

Bodies of water
Bodies of water at least partly in the parish:

Buctouche River (Upper North Branch)
Canaan River (Upper North Branch)
Coal Branch River
Richibucto River
Sabbies River
Salmon River
Glen Branch
Second Branch
Big Forks Stream
Forks Stream
Lake Stream
Little Forks Stream
Adamsville Lake
Birch Ridge Lake
Coal Branch Lake
Spectacle Lake
Trout Brook Lake

Other notable places
Parks, historic sites, and other noteworthy places at least partly in the parish.

 Canaan Bog Protected Natural Area
 Lake Stream Protected Natural Area
 Trout Brook Protected Natural Area
 West Branch Coy Brook Protected Natural Area

Demographics

Population
Population trend

Language
Mother tongue (2016)

See also
List of parishes in New Brunswick

Notes

References

Parishes of Kent County, New Brunswick
Local service districts of Kent County, New Brunswick